Gospel Oak is an EP by Irish singer Sinéad O'Connor. The album sold  70,000 copies in United States.

The album is named after the London neighbourhood of Gospel Oak where O’Connor was living at the time. The cover photograph shows the two brick skew arch bridges adjacent to Gospel Oak railway station in north London. It was dedicated to "the people of Israel, Rwanda and Northern Ireland".

Critical reception
British magazine Music Week rated the EP four out of five, writing, "Motherhood is treating O'Connor well, judging by this angst-free, truly beautiful EP on which the acoustic, traditional instrumentation is the perfect foil for her stunning voice. Another Chrysalis number one?" David Sinclair from The Times commented, "The Gaelic avenger in a gentle, devotional mood."

Track listing

The UK release contains only the first four tracks. The Japanese release contains tracks 1–4 and 7, and an US release contains track 1–6 on one CD and track 7 on a bonus CD.

Personnel
Sinéad O'Connor – vocals, electric guitar on track 5
John Reynolds – drums, bass guitar, programming
Clare Kenny – bass guitar
Justin Adams – guitar
Caroline Dale – cello
Carol Issacs – piano, accordion
Ian Stanley, Graham Henderson – keyboards
Davy Spillane – Uilleann pipes
Ed Rockett – low and high whistle
The Muses – backing vocals
Jah Wobble – bass guitar on  track 3
Andy Wright – programming on track 3
Dónal Lunny – bouzouki

Charts

References

1997 debut EPs
Sinéad O'Connor albums
Chrysalis Records EPs